Ryan S. Dancey is a  businessman who has worked primarily in the collectible card game and role-playing game industries. He was vice president in charge of Dungeons & Dragons at Wizards of the Coast.

When the publisher of Dungeons & Dragons was facing bankruptcy, Dancey helped negotiate sale of the property to Wizards of the Coast.

Dancey promoted the D&D's open gaming license (OGL), which reversed the policy from opposing third-party publications to supporting them.

Career
Dancey was the owner of distributor Isomedia Inc, which was helping to fund Legend of the Five Rings (1995), and he joined in on the project. In 1996 the principals behind the game created a new company with better funding, calling it Five Rings Publishing Group. Robert Abramowitz became the President of the new company, and Alderac Entertainment Group (AEG) and Isomedia gave over their rights to Legend of the Five Rings, with Dancey becoming Vice President of Product Development and John Zinser of AEG becoming VP of Sales.

In early 1997, TSR was approaching bankruptcy and looking for a buyer; Abramowitz and Dancey negotiated a deal to purchase TSR, which they brought to Peter Adkison at Wizards of the Coast, who purchased Five Rings Publishing along with TSR. At the end of the next year the Five Rings Publishing Group was dissolved, and Dancey took over as the business head of Wizards of the Coast's roleplaying department, where he became involved in the development of the third edition of Dungeons & Dragons. Adkison put Dancey in charge of business and marketing for TSR. Dancey championed Wizards of the Coast's purchase of Last Unicorn Games in 2000, to obtain their more efficient R&D force and bring it in with Wizards' existing RPG staff. Dancey largely conceived of the Open Gaming License (OGL) and d20 System Trademark License, based on his belief that the true strength of D&D was in its gaming community. He said that TSR was far too aggressive looking for copyright violations and alienated fans. The OGL was published by WOTC in 2000 to license the System Reference Document (SRD) for D&D in a move spearheaded by Dancey. Dancey also co-authored the Hero Builder's Guidebook (2000). Dancey later moved to "consultant" status, and was among those employees laid off by Wizards before the end of 2002.

Dancey later worked for Icelandic video game producer CCP Games, which had purchased White Wolf Publishing.

In 2011, Dancey began working on Goblinworks "Pathfinder Online" Sandbox MMORPG. In August 2015, interim Goblinworks CEO Lisa Stevens announced that Ryan Dancey had left Goblinworks for personal reasons. In a separate letter to players, she indicated that Dancey was still involved, and would continue to consult on the project.

References

External links
 

American game designers
Dungeons & Dragons game designers
Living people
Place of birth missing (living people)
Year of birth missing (living people)